The Cowon Z2 Plenue is an Android-based portable media player manufactured by Cowon Systems, Inc. Its release was announced on . In the year of its release, the Z2 was awarded the iF product design award.

The Z2 is widely considered to be the successor to the earlier D3 Plenue, upon which it improves in a number of ways, most notably of which is speed. The Z2 features a 1 GHz Cortex-A8 CPU and has 512 MB of RAM. Aside from the CPU, it also contains a 320 MHz Mali-200 GPU and an 800 MHz Mali-VE6 VPU.

The Z2 was received well by critics. An Engadget reviewer called it “stunningly quick”, and proceeded to state that “the touch response was just as good as on our Galaxy S II. In fact, that's indicative of the overall system.” Additionally, the Z2 has received consistently favourable reviews at online stores such as Amazon.com and Advanced MP3 Players.

The Z2 features a 3.7-inch, Gorilla Glass-covered Super AMOLED touchscreen with pixel dimensions of 480×800. It comes in black or white, with internal flash memory capacities ranging from 8 to 32 GB. Additionally, it supports external data storage via microSD transflash card up to 128 Gigabytes

References

Touchscreen portable media players